Red Beach Base Area (also known as Camp JK Books, Camp Haskins, Camp Viking, Paddock Compound or Red Beach Camp) is a complex of former U.S. Marines, Navy and Army and Army of the Republic of Vietnam (ARVN) logistics and support bases northwest of Danang.

History
The base was located along Highway 1, 8 km northwest of Danang at Red Beach, the site of the landing of the 9th Marine Regiment, the first US combat troops deployed to South Vietnam on 8 March 1965.

The area comprised a number of separate adjacent bases as follows:
Camp JK Books, Headquarters of Force Logistics Command, U.S. Marine Corps, responsible to III Marine Amphibious Force (III MAF).
Camp Haskins, split into Camp Haskins North used as a base for the 31st Naval Construction Regiment and Camp Haskins South which was used as the Headquarters, III MAF after their move from Camp Horn in March 1970
Camp Viking, base for the 58th Transport Battalion from February 1968 to April 1972 and the 39th Engineer Battalion
Paddock Compound, base for the 18th Engineer Brigade

The base area was handed over to the ARVN in March 1972. Camp Viking was used by the ARVN 102nd Artillery Battalion.

Current use
The area has largely been turned over to housing although part of it remains in use by the People's Army of Vietnam.

References

Installations of the United States Army in South Vietnam
Military installations of the United States Marine Corps in South Vietnam
Installations of the Army of the Republic of Vietnam
Buildings and structures in Quảng Nam province